Edward J. Stubbs (1833–1887) was an American merchant sea captain and a shipwright during a prolific period at Yarmouth Harbor in Maine. His shipyard was one of the four major ones during the town's peak years of 1850–1875.

Career

In 1851, Stubbs went into partnership with Henry Hutchins, forming Hutchins & Stubbs. They launched over 21 vessels at Yarmouth's harbor between 1866 and 1884, including the three-mast barkentine Harriet S. Jackson.

Personal life
Stubbs married Helen A. Merrill on June 3, 1877. They had one known child: Harry L. Stubbs (1862–1931).

The Stubbses lived at today's 109 Main Street in Yarmouth, Maine, which he had constructed in 1850.

Death
Stubbs died in 1887, aged 53 or 54. His wife survived him by 28 years. They are both buried in Yarmouth's Riverside Cemetery.

References

People from Yarmouth, Maine
1833 births
1887 deaths
Sea captains
American shipwrights
Burials in Maine